The Old Rock School was added to the National Register of Historic Places in 1983.

History
The building served as an elementary school until the mid 1900s. In the 1980s, a memorial was added to the site to honor local soldiers who served in wars from the Black Hawk War to World War II.

References

Prairie du Chien, Wisconsin
School buildings on the National Register of Historic Places in Wisconsin
Buildings and structures in Crawford County, Wisconsin
Defunct schools in Wisconsin
Greek Revival architecture in Wisconsin
Government buildings completed in 1857
National Register of Historic Places in Crawford County, Wisconsin
1857 establishments in Wisconsin